Chertkov, Chertkoff or Tchertkoff is a Russian masculine originating from the word chort, meaning devil, demon. Its feminine counterpart is Chertkova. The surname may refer to the following notable people:

Anatoly Chertkov (1936–2014), Russian football midfielder
Fenia Chertkoff (1869–1927), Russian-Argentinean feminist, educator, political activist and sculptor
Vladimir Chertkov (1854–1936), Russian editor of the works of Leo Tolstoy
Wladimir Tchertkoff, Italian journalist

References

Russian-language surnames